The Vietnam International, formerly Vietnam Satellite and Hanoi International, is an international badminton tournament held in Vietnam. This tournament has been an International Challenge level since 2008. Another tournament named Vietnam International Series established in 2014, and Vietnam Open established in 1996.

Previous winners

Performances by nation

References 

Badminton tournaments in Vietnam
Sports competitions in Vietnam